Maximo Alberto Castillo (born May 4, 1999) is a Venezuelan professional baseball pitcher for the Kansas City Royals of Major League Baseball (MLB). He previously played in MLB for the Toronto Blue Jays, for whom he made his debut in 2022.

Career

Toronto Blue Jays
Castillo was signed by the Toronto Blue Jays in 2015, and was assigned to the DSL Blue Jays for the 2016 season. Later that season, he was promoted to the GCL Blue Jays. Castillo began the 2017 season with the GCL Blue Jays, before being promoted to the Bluefield Blue Jays later that season. After he finished the 2017 season with them, he was promoted to the Lansing Lugnuts to start the 2018 season. After spending the whole season with the team, he started the 2019 season with the Dunedin Blue Jays before being promoted to the Buffalo Bisons. After the cancelled 2020 minor league season, he played the 2021 season with the Vancouver Canadians and the New Hampshire Fisher Cats.

Castillo started the 2022 season with the Buffalo Bisons, before being called up on June 19, 2022. He made his debut that day, allowing two home runs and striking out one in one inning pitched. He was in the majors for a couple days before being optioned back down to Buffalo, but he was recalled on July 7, after Blue Jays starting pitchers Yusei Kikuchi and Kevin Gausman came down with injuries. Castillo made his first MLB career start on July 10, 2022.

Kansas City Royals
On August 2, 2022, the Blue Jays traded Castillo and Samad Taylor to the Kansas City Royals in exchange for Whit Merrifield. On August 18, Castillo was recalled from the Omaha Storm Chasers.  Castillo pitched 5 innings, allowing 3 hits and 1 run, while striking out 3 batters in his Royals debut.  He appeared in 5 total games (4 starts) for Kansas City down the stretch, struggling to an 0-2 record and 9.16 ERA with 17 strikeouts in 18.2 innings pitched.

Castillo was optioned to Triple-A Omaha to begin the 2023 season.

References

External links

1999 births
Living people
Major League Baseball players from Venezuela
Major League Baseball pitchers
Toronto Blue Jays players
Kansas City Royals players
Dominican Summer League Blue Jays players
Gulf Coast Blue Jays players
Bluefield Blue Jays players
Lansing Lugnuts players
Dunedin Blue Jays players
Cardenales de Lara players
New Hampshire Fisher Cats players
Buffalo Bisons (minor league) players